Kamal Abdul Naser Chowdhury (known as Kamal Chowdhury; born 31 December 1957) is a Bengali poet and a member of the Bangladesh Civil Service. He was the Chief Coordinator of the National Implementation Committee for the Celebration of Mujib Borsho, the Birth Centenary of Sheikh Mujibur Rahman, the founding father of Bangladesh. He is a former Principal Secretary of the Prime Minister of Bangladesh.

He is mostly known for his works on literature, especially poetry. He was awarded Bangla Academy Literary Award in 2011 for his contributions to Bengali poetry and Ekushe Podok 2022 for his contributions to Bengali language and literature.

Early life and education 
Chowdhury was born on 31 December 1957, in Vijaykara village of Chauddagram Upazila of Comilla District. He is the second among six children of Ahmad Hossain Chowdhury and Begum Tahira Hossain. In 1973, he passed Secondary School Certificate from Gaidyanil High School in Narayanganj District and Higher Secondary School Certificate from Dhaka College in 1975. Then he studied sociology at University of Dhaka and received Bachelor's and master's degree. In 2000, he completed PhD in anthropology at the retirement of government jobs. The subject of his PhD dissertation is 'Matrutulan Rasa tradition of Garo people'.

Working life 
In 1982, Kamal Chowdhury took up the job as a member of the Bangladesh Civil Service. After serving jobs in different positions in 2010, he was promoted as Secretary of the Government of Bangladesh. While being additional secretary of the Ministry of Information (Bangladesh), he was appointed as Acting Secretary of the same ministry. Afterwards, he served as Secretary of Information for some time. From 2010 to 2014 he was the Secretary of Ministry of Education. After that, he served as the Secretary of the Ministry of Public Administration from March 2014. At this time, he was promoted as the Senior Secretary of the Government. After retiring from work in late 2016, he was appointed as the Principal Secretary of Prime Minister of Bangladesh. He also represented Bangladesh at the UNESCO Executive Board for the term 2014–2017.

On 22 January 2022, Chowdhury was awarded the Ekushey Padak, the second most important award for civilians in Bangladesh.

Publications 
Kamal Chowdhury's first poetry book was published in the year 1981. The list of his poetry books are:
 Michhiler Shoman Boyoshi (As Old as the Procession), 1981
Ae Poth Ae Kolahol, 1993
 Asheci Nejer Vore, 1995
 Ae Meg Biduthe Vora, 1997
 Duli O Sagor Drisho, 2000
 Rod Brishti Antomil, 2003
 He Mati Prithibiputro, 2006
 Premer Kobita, 2008
 Panthoshalar Ghora, 2010

wards 

 Bangla Academy Literary Award (2011)
 Ekushe padak(2022)

References 

1957 births
Living people
University of Dhaka alumni
Recipients of Bangla Academy Award
Bengali-language writers
Bangladeshi male poets
Best Lyricist National Film Award (Bangladesh) winners
Recipients of the Ekushey Padak